Wayne Evans may refer to:
Wayne Evans (Welsh footballer) (born 1971), former Welsh football player with Walsall and Rochdale
Wayne Evans (Australian footballer) (born 1958), former Australian rules footballer
Wayne Evans (rugby league) (born 1974), former professional rugby league footballer
Wayne Evans (rugby union) (born 1984), Welsh rugby union scrum half